Greg Williamson (born January 1965) is an American jazz musician and composer of jazz music.

Early life and education 
Williamson was born and raised in Western Washington. After graduating from Bremerton High School, he earned a Bachelor of Music from Central Washington University and a Master of Music from Western Washington University.

Career 
Williamson has performed with Woody Herman, The Glenn Miller Orchestra, and the Harry James Orchestra. As part of Steve Allen's re-work of the Tonight Show, Williamson went on tour with performers including Joe Williams, Rosemary Clooney, Paul Smith, Louis Nye and Bill "Jose Jimenez" Dana. In the 1990s, Williamson performed with Don Rickles, Bob Newhart, and Joan Rivers; he regularly played the drums for Grammy-nominated jazz vocalist Ernestine Anderson and eventually became her musical director. He has also performed solo at such venues as The Washington Center for the Performing Arts.

Williamson created a non-profit organization for music performance and education in North Bend, Washington, named JazzClubsNW. Williamson is a music instructor at Green River College and Bellevue College. He was the graduate jazz and percussion assistant at Central Washington University for two years. Williamson is also a jazz instructor at Western Washington University.

In 2019, Williamson published a 62-page book called Jazz Traditions A Collection of Drum Set Teaching.

References 

American jazz drummers
American jazz composers
Place of birth missing (living people)
Living people
People from North Bend, Washington
Western Washington University faculty
Central Washington University faculty
Western Washington University alumni
Central Washington University alumni
Musicians from Washington (state)
Jazz musicians from Washington (state)
People from Bremerton, Washington
1965 births
People from Kitsap County, Washington